The second 1952 Buenos Aires Grand Prix was held in Buenos Aires on March 16, 1952, as the second inauguration race of the Autódromo Oscar Gálvez.

Classification

References

Buenos Aires Grand Prix (II)
Buenos Aires Grand Prix (II)
Buenos Aires Grand Prix